Mauricio Sulaimán Saldivar (born 30 December 1969) is a Mexican businessman and sports administrator. Sulaiman is, since February 11, 2014, the president of the Mexico based World Boxing Council, which is, along with the United States based International Boxing Federation, the Panama based World Boxing Association and the Puerto Rico based World Boxing Organization, one of the four major international boxing championship recognizing groups. Before becoming president of the WBC, Sulaiman worked there as its general secretary.

Personal
Sulaimán is the son of the previous WBC president, José Sulaimán, and of Marta Saldivar. He has two brothers (Hector and Jose Fernando-Jose Jr.) and two sisters (Lucy and Claudia).

Controversy
Sulaimán has recently come under fire for praising Daniel Kinahan's work as a boxing promoter. Kinahan is infamously known for being part of a powerful Irish criminal syndicate run by his father, Christy Kinahan and who is involved in a violent war with another notorious gang, this one led by Gerry "The Monk" Hutch. Recently, Kinahan, his father and his younger brother were sanctioned by the US government for their activities linked to organized crime and had their assets frozen by both the US government and the UAE. Sulaimán, who had met with Kinahan in Dubai a week before the sanctions, denied having any affiliation with him, saying he was unaware that Kinahan was a high-ranking member of a powerful international criminal syndicate.

See also
Gilberto Mendoza, Jr.
List of Mexicans

External links

1969 births
Boxing in Mexico
Mexican businesspeople
Living people
Mexican people of Lebanese descent
Mexican people of Syrian descent
People from Mexico City